Italy and North Korea have no formal diplomatic ties, although they maintain quiet trade, tourism and security contacts.

History
For a long time, North Korea was considered isolationist and "politically reclusive".

That changed in January 2000, when Italy announced its opening of official diplomatic relations with North Korea by Lamberto Dini, Italy's foreign minister, who also brokered reconciliation pacts at that time with Iran and Libya of Muammar Gaddafi.

North Korea's representative for the UN's Food and Agriculture Organization met with Lamberto Dini to formally establish diplomatic ties. Formal ties with a member of the G7 was considered a huge step for North Korea at the time.

In 2017 Italy expelled N.K.'s ambassador, in response to N.K.'s continued pursuit of its nuclear weapons program.
In 2020, Italy severed ties with relations.

References

 
Bilateral relations of North Korea
North Korea